Señora Juanita (diminutive of Juana) is a name used for the average Chilean, and specially the older women from the countryside (in the manner of Britishman John Bull). A typical usage is: "How would you explain that to Señora Juanita?" (¿Cómo le diría eso a la Señora Juanita?). An example of the name used in this generic way can be seen in the title of this paper from the Centro de Economía Aplicada, Universidad de Chile: Estimando la demanda residencial por electricidad en Chile: a doña Juanita le importa el precio (Calculating the residential demand for electricity in Chile: Mrs. Jones does care about the price). 

President Ricardo Lagos used the name during his May 21 speech in 2004.

See also
 Donna Juanita
 Juan Bimba
 Huaso
 Roto
 Brother Jonathan
 Uncle Sam
 John Bull

References 

National personifications